Shore Leave may refer to:

 Shore leave, the leave that professional sailors get to spend on dry land
 "Shore Leave" (Star Trek: The Original Series), a first season episode of Star Trek: The Original Series
 Shore Leave, a The Venture Brothers character parodying Shipwreck (G.I. Joe)
Shore Leave (1925 film), a film starring Richard Barthelmess
Shore Leave (1962 film), a Soviet film directed by Feliks Mironer

See also
 Shore lead, oceanographic term for a waterway opening between pack ice and shore